Bartosz Kamil Kurek (born 29 August 1988) is a Polish professional volleyball player. He is a member of the Poland national team, a participant in the Olympic Games (London 2012, Rio 2016, Tokyo 2020), 2018 World Champion, 2009 European Champion, and the 2012 World League winner. In 2019, he became the first ever volleyball player to be voted the Polish Sports Personality of the Year. At the professional club level, he plays for Wolfdogs Nagoya.

Personal life
Bartosz Kurek was born in Wałbrzych, but raised in Nysa. His father, Adam Kurek, was also a volleyball player. Kurek played basketball in his early youth, but later decided to choose volleyball. He has a younger brother – Jakub. Kurek is married to Anna Grejman.

Career

Clubs
Kurek began his career in a team from Nysa (2004–2005), where he played alongside his father. He spent the next 3 years playing for a PlusLiga club, ZAKSA Kędzierzyn-Koźle (2005–2008).

In 2008, he moved to PGE Skra Bełchatów, one of the most successful teams in PlusLiga, where he quickly became a key player. With Skra, he won the Polish Championship three times: in 2009, 2010 and 2011. On the international stage, he won two Club World Championship silver medals, in 2009 and 2010, and a bronze medal of the CEV Champions League in 2010. On 18 March 2012, they won a silver medal of the CEV Champions League after losing to Zenit Kazan in the final held in Łódź, Poland. Kurek received an individual award for the Best Spiker of the tournament.

After the 2011–12 PlusLiga season, Kurek left PGE Skra Bełchatów, and signed a contract with the Russian team, Dynamo Moscow, however, due to injury, he was unable to play for his new team for a large part of the season.

After one season in Russia, Kurek moved to Italian club Lube Banca Macerata. In 2014, they won the Italian Championship, beating Sir Safety Perugia in the final. On 15 October 2014, Lube, including Kurek, won the Italian Super Cup, beating Copra Elior Piacenza (3–2).

On 4 May 2015, Kurek signed a contract with Asseco Resovia. After winning a silver medal of the Polish Championship in 2016, he left Resovia and signed a contract with Japanese club JT Thunders.

On 2 October 2016, he announced suspending his sports career due to physical and mental fatigue. At the same time, he terminated the contract with JT Thunders. In September, he moved back to his former club – PGE Skra Bełchatów.

In 2018, Kurek joined Polish club Stocznia Szczecin. On 29 November 2018, due to club's financial problems, Kurek terminated his contract with Stocznia. On 6 December 2018, he joined ONICO Warszawa after leaving Stocznia Szczecin a few days earlier.

National team
Kurek was a part of the Polish national volleyball team which won a gold medal at the 2009 European Championship held in Turkey. On 14 September 2009, he was awarded the Knight's Cross of Polonia Restituta. The Order was conferred on the following day by the Prime Minister of Poland, Donald Tusk.

On 10 July 2011, Kurek, alongside his national team, won the Poland's first medal of the World League. They won a bronze medal after defeating Argentina. Kurek received an individual award for the Best Scorer of the final tournament. In the same year, Poland took part in the European Championship, where they were the defending champions. Kurek was his team's key player throughout the whole tournament in which the Polish national team won a second medal in 2011 after winning the match for third place against Russia. At the same tournament, Kurek was awarded with his second individual award in 2011, for the Best Server of the tournament. In November 2011, despite a back injury, Kurek went to Japan to participate at the World Cup, and helped his team win a silver medal and therefore qualify for the Olympic Games.

On 8 July 2012, the Polish team won a gold medal of the World League. Kurek received an award for the Most Valuable Player. Kurek was one of the key players of the Polish team at the Olympic Games (London 2012), but  nonetheless Poland lost in the quarterfinal to Russia, and was eliminated from the tournament.

In 2014, he was a member of the Polish national team during the 2015 European Championship qualification. He was not included in the Polish national team for the World Championship held in Poland.

After a one year break, he came back to the national team on 28 May 2015 during the first match of intercontinental round of the World League against Russia (3–0). He was a top scorer of the match (15 points).

On 30 September 2018, Poland achieved its third title of the World Champion. Poland beat Brazil in the final (3–0), and defended the title from 2014. Kurek received an individual award for the Most Valuable Player of the tournament.

Honours

Clubs
 CEV Champions League
  2011/2012 – with PGE Skra Bełchatów
 FIVB Club World Championship
  Doha 2009 – with PGE Skra Bełchatów
  Doha 2010 – with PGE Skra Bełchatów
 CEV Cup
  2017/2018 – with Ziraat Bankası Ankara
 National championships
 2008/2009  Polish Cup, with PGE Skra Bełchatów
 2008/2009  Polish Championship, with PGE Skra Bełchatów
 2009/2010  Polish Championship, with PGE Skra Bełchatów
 2010/2011  Polish Cup, with PGE Skra Bełchatów
 2010/2011  Polish Championship, with PGE Skra Bełchatów
 2011/2012  Polish Cup, with PGE Skra Bełchatów
 2013/2014  Italian Championship, with Cucine Lube Banca Marche Macerata
 2014/2015  Italian SuperCup, with Cucine Lube Banca Marche Treia
 2021/2022  Emperor's Cup, with Wolfdogs Nagoya

Youth national team
 2005  CEV U19 European Championship

Individual awards
 2005: CEV U19 European Championship – Best Spiker
 2009: FIVB Club World Championship – Best Scorer
 2011: Polish Cup – Best Spiker
 2011: FIVB World League – Best Scorer
 2011: CEV European Championship – Best Server
 2012: CEV Champions League – Best Spiker
 2012: FIVB World League – Most Valuable Player
 2018: FIVB World Championship – Most Valuable Player
 2018: CEV Male Volleyball Player of the Year
 2019: Polish Sports Personality of the Year 2018
 2021: FIVB Nations League – Most Valuable Player (shared with Wallace de Souza)
 2021: FIVB Nations League – Best Opposite Spiker 
 2021: Emperor's Cup – Most Valuable Player
 2022: FIVB World Championship – Best Opposite Spiker

State awards
 2009:  Knight's Cross of Polonia Restituta
 2018:  Officer's Cross of Polonia Restituta

References

External links

 
 
 
 Player profile at LegaVolley.it 
 Player profile at PlusLiga.pl 
 Player profile at Volleybox.net

1988 births
Living people
People from Wałbrzych
Polish men's volleyball players
Polish Champions of men's volleyball
Italian Champions of men's volleyball
Olympic volleyball players of Poland
Volleyball players at the 2012 Summer Olympics
Volleyball players at the 2016 Summer Olympics
Volleyball players at the 2020 Summer Olympics
Knights of the Order of Polonia Restituta
Polish expatriate sportspeople in Russia
Expatriate volleyball players in Russia
Polish expatriate sportspeople in Italy
Expatriate volleyball players in Italy
Polish expatriate sportspeople in Turkey
Expatriate volleyball players in Turkey
Polish expatriate sportspeople in Japan
Expatriate volleyball players in Japan
Stal Nysa players
ZAKSA Kędzierzyn-Koźle players
Skra Bełchatów players
Volley Lube players
Resovia (volleyball) players
Ziraat Bankası volleyball players
Projekt Warsaw players
Outside hitters
Opposite hitters